Silvan Inia (born January 24, 1969 in Hoorn, North Holland) is a retired football midfielder from the Netherlands, who made his professional debut in the 1991-1992 season for AZ Alkmaar. Later on he played for FC Volendam, Sparta Rotterdam, Stormvogels Telstar and FC Emmen.

References
  Profile

1969 births
Living people
Dutch footballers
Association football midfielders
AZ Alkmaar players
FC Volendam players
Sparta Rotterdam players
FC Emmen players
Eredivisie players
Eerste Divisie players
People from Hoorn
Footballers from North Holland